The Whole SHeBANG is the debut studio album by the American country music group SHeDAISY. It was released on May 11, 1999 on Lyric Street Records, and has been certified platinum by the Recording Industry Association of America. Singles from this album were "Little Good-Byes," "This Woman Needs," "I Will… But," "Lucky 4 You (Tonight I'm Just Me)" and "Still Holding Out for You."

Critical reception
Stephen Thomas Erlewine of Allmusic said that he did not consider the album country in sound, but still thought that the songs were well-executed, praising Kristyn Osborn's songwriting skills and the trio's vocal harmonies. He gave the album four stars out of five.

Track listing

Personnel
As listed in liner notes.

SHeDAISY
Kassidy Osborn - lead vocals
Kelsi Osborn - background vocals
Kristyn Osborn - background vocals

Studio musicians
Mike Brignardello – bass guitar
Vinnie Colaiuta – drums
Eric Darken – percussion
Dan Dugmore – steel guitar
Paul Franklin – steel guitar
Gordon Kennedy – electric guitar
Aubrey Haynie – fiddle
John Hobbs – keyboards
Dann Huff – electric guitar
Tim Lauer – keyboards, electric piano, accordion, Hammond B-3 organ
Paul Leim – drums
B. James Lowry – acoustic guitar
Terry McMillan – percussion, harmonica
Steve Nathan – keyboards
Glenn Worf – bass guitar
Biff Watson – acoustic guitar
Jonathan Yudkin – mandolin

Charts

Weekly charts

Year-end charts

The Whole SHeBANG: All Mixed Up

A remixed version of the album, The Whole SHeBANG: All Mixed Up, was released on September 25, 2001. It received a two-star rating from Maria Konicki Dinoia of AllMusic, who said, "unless you're a hardcore SheDAISY fan, there really isn't anything excitingly new here or that you haven't heard already."

Track listing (All Mixed Up)
"Little Good-Byes" - 3:51
"I Will... But" - 4:28
"This Woman Needs" - 3:18
"Before Me and You" - 3:37
"Lucky 4 You (Tonight I'm Just Me)" - 5:36
"Still Holding Out for You" - 4:21
"Punishment" - 4:27
"'Cause I Like It That Way" - 5:01
"Without Your Love" - 5:30
"A Night to Remember" - 5:06
"Dancing with Angels" - 6:21

Chart performance (All Mixed Up)

References

1999 debut albums
SHeDAISY albums
Lyric Street Records albums
Albums produced by Dann Huff
2001 remix albums